R. graveolens may refer to:
 Russula graveolens, an edible fungus species
 Ruta graveolens, the common rue or herb of grace, a flowering plant species native to the Balkan Peninsula

See also